Nikon Z-mount (stylised as ) is an interchangeable lens mount developed by Nikon for its mirrorless digital cameras. In late 2018, Nikon released two cameras that use this mount, the full-frame Nikon Z 7 and Nikon Z 6. In late 2019 Nikon announced their first Z-mount camera with an APS-C sensor, the Nikon Z 50. In July 2020 the entry level full-frame Z 5 was introduced. In October 2020, Nikon announced the Nikon Z 6II and Nikon Z 7II, which succeed the Z 6 and Z 7, respectively. The APS-C lineup was expanded in July 2021, with the introduction of the retro styled Nikon Z fc, and in October 2021, Nikon unveiled the Nikon Z 9, which effectively succeeds the brand's flagship D6 DSLR. The APS-C lineup was further expanded with the Nikon Z 30, announced at the end of June 2022.

Nikon SLR cameras, both film and digital, have used the Nikon F-mount with its 44 mm diameter since 1959. The Z-mount has a 55 mm diameter. The FTZ lens adapter allows many F-mount lenses to be used on Z-mount cameras. The FTZ allows AF-S, AF-P and AF-I lenses to autofocus on Z-mount cameras. The older screw-drive AF and AF-D lenses will not autofocus with the FTZ adapter, but they do retain metering and Exif data. Z-mount cameras support metering as well as in-body image stabilization (IBIS) with manual focus lenses.

The 55 mm throat diameter of the Nikon Z-mount makes it the largest full-frame lens mount. It is much larger than the F-mount, the Sony E-mount used by Sony mirrorless cameras but only slightly larger than the 54 mm of both the Canon EF and Canon RF mounts. It is also slightly larger than the 51.6 mm diameter full-frame mirrorless Leica L-Mount. The Z-mount has also a very short flange distance of 16 mm, which is shorter than all mentioned lens mounts.

The introduction of the Z-mount also saw the re-introduction of the Noct brand, used to describe the 58 mm  S Noct lens with an ultra-fast maximum aperture.

Nikon published a roadmap outlining which lenses are forthcoming when the Z-mount system was initially announced. The roadmap has been updated multiple times. As of November 2022 the current version of the roadmap indicates six more lenses to be released within 2023.

Z-mount cameras

 The supported video frame rates are: 24/25/30 fps when up to 30 fps are supported, while cameras supporting up to 60 fps also support 50 fps recording. Cameras supporting up to 120 fps also support 100 fps recording. Cameras supporting 100/120 fps recording can also record in x4/x5 slow motion directly (targeting 24/25/30 fps video frame rates), which means playback of the resulting video file is already in slow motion, without the need for editing.
 Apart from the Z 9, all cameras have a 30-minute length limitation for internal recording. External recording time is only limited by battery life.
 External 10-bit recording can optionally use N-Log, a profile for recording video. The Z 6II and Z 7II also support external recording of 10-bit hybrid log gamma (HLG) video.
 For the Z 6/7 series, the extra-cost 12-bit upgrade enables external recording of 12-bit ProRes RAW. The resulting footage has greater dynamic range than 8- or 10-bit footage. However, the camera uses pixel skipping (which is necessary since ProRes RAW directly stores non-debayered sensor data) resulting in a somewhat softer image with more noise and more frequent appearance of moiré patterns compared to the full-width downsampling 8- and 10-bit modes.

Z-mount lenses 

Nikon uses these designations in their Z-mount lens names:

 S-Line — High-end lenses
 DX — Lens only covers the DX image circle. FX cameras will switch to DX crop mode.
 MC — Macro lenses with 1:1 magnification.
 SE — Lenses with exterior design matching the Nikon Z fc camera.
 VR — Vibration Reduction. Uses a moving optical group to reduce the photographic effects of camera shake.
 TC — Switchable teleconverter built into the lens.

Prime lenses 

 Nikkor Z 20 mm 1.8 S
 Nikkor Z 24 mm 1.8 S
 Nikkor Z 26 mm 2.8
 Nikkor Z 28 mm 2.8 SE
 Nikkor Z 28 mm 2.8
 Nikkor Z 35 mm 1.8 S
 Nikkor Z 40 mm 2
 Nikkor Z 40 mm 2 SE
 Nikkor Z 50 mm 1.2 S
 Nikkor Z 50 mm 1.8 S
 Nikkor Z MC 50 mm 2.8 macro lens
 Nikkor Z 58 mm 0.95 S NOCT (manual focus)
 Nikkor Z 85 mm 1.2 S
 Nikkor Z 85 mm 1.8 S
 Nikkor Z MC 105 mm 2.8 VR S macro lens
 Nikkor Z 400 mm 2.8 TC VR S (integrated 1.4x teleconverter giving 560 mm 4)
 Nikkor Z 400 mm 4.5 VR S
 Nikkor Z 600 mm 4 TC VR S (integrated 1.4x teleconverter giving 840 mm 5.6)
 Nikkor Z 800 mm 6.3 VR S

Zoom lenses 

 Nikkor Z 14-24 mm 2.8 S
 Nikkor Z 14-30 mm 4 S
 Nikkor Z 17-28 mm 2.8
 Nikkor Z 24-50 mm 4-6.3
 Nikkor Z 24-70 mm 2.8 S
 Nikkor Z 24-70 mm 4 S
 Nikkor Z 24-120 mm 4 S
 Nikkor Z 24-200 mm 4-6.3 VR
 Nikkor Z 28-75 mm 2.8
 Nikkor Z 70-200 mm 2.8 VR S
 Nikkor Z 100-400 mm 4.5-5.6 VR S

DX lenses 

 Nikkor Z DX 16-50 mm 3.5-6.3 VR
 Nikkor Z DX 18-140 mm 3.5-6.3 VR
 Nikkor Z DX 50-250 mm 4.5-6.3 VR

Teleconverters 

 Nikon Z TC-1.4x
 Nikon Z TC-2.0x

The Nikon teleconverters are only compatible with select Nikon Z lenses. They cannot be used in conjunction with the FTZ adapter. Z-mount teleconverters cannot be mounted on top of each other.

The following lenses are compatible with the Nikon teleconverters:

 Nikkor Z 400 mm 2.8 TC VR S
 Nikkor Z 400 mm 4.5 VR S
 Nikkor Z 600 mm 4 TC VR S
 Nikkor Z 800 mm 6.3 VR S
 Nikkor Z 70-200 mm 2.8 VR S
 Nikkor Z 100-400 mm 4.5-5.6 VR S

Mount adapters 

 Nikon FTZ: The FTZ supports F-mount lenses on Z-mount cameras. Metering, IBIS and Exif metadata are supported with any F-mount lens, including manual lenses, while autofocus is only supported with AF-I, AF-S and AF-P lenses. Variable autofocus speed for video shooting is only supported with AF-P and select AF-S lenses. The FTZ adds 30.5 mm to the length of the attached lens, which is the difference in flange distance between the Nikon F-mount (46.5 mm) and the Z-mount (16 mm).
 Nikon FTZ II: Same performance as the FTZ, but without the integrated tripod foot for easier vertical shooting with the Z 9.

Nikon specifies lens compatibility as in the following table. F-mount teleconverters can be used on compatible lenses, but the Z-mount teleconverters may not be used in conjunction with the FTZ. For details on the lens types, refer to Nikon F-mount.

Third-party lenses and adapters 

Numerous manufacturers offer purely manual lenses and lens mount adapters for the Z-mount. These do not interface electronically to the camera and do not support autofocus or automatic control of the aperture. Some manufacturers offer lenses and adapters with full electronic functionality (autofocus, automatic aperture control, Exif metadata etc.). Third-party lenses and adapters often rely on reverse engineering the electronic protocol of a lens mount and might not work properly on new cameras or firmware versions. However, Cosina, Sigma and Tamron licensed the mount from Nikon, enabling full compatibility.

Autofocus lenses 

 Sigma DC DN 16/1.4 (DX)
 Sigma DC DN 30/1.4 (DX)
 Sigma DC DN 56/1.4 (DX)
 Tamron 70-300mm 4.5-6.3 Di III RXD (model A047)
 Viltrox AF 24/1.8 Z
 Viltrox AF 35/1.8 Z
 Viltrox AF 85/1.8 Z
 Viltrox AF 23/1.4 Z (DX)
 Viltrox AF 33/1.4 Z (DX)
 Viltrox AF 56/1.4 Z (DX)
 Yongnuo YN50mm F1.8Z DF DSM
 Yongnuo YN85mm F1.8Z DF DSM

Autofocus adapters 

 For Canon EF lenses
 The Fringer EF-NZ adapter provides full electronic integration (autofocus, image stabilization, aperture control).
 The Techart TZC-01 also provides full electronic integration.
 For Contax G lenses
 The Techart TZG-01 adapts Contax G lenses with mechanical autofocus to Nikon Z.
 For Leica M mount lenses
 The Megadap MTZ11 contains a focusing helicoid with 6.5 mm of extension which is used for autofocus. This range is sufficient to cover the full focusing range of lenses up to around 50 mm focal length.
 The Techart TZM-01 is similar to the Megadap MTZ11 and enables autofocus with M-mount lenses.
 The Techart TZM-02 is a refined version of the TZM-01 with better autofocus performance.
 The Fotodiox LM-NKZ-PRN is another autofocus Leica M to Z adapter.
 For Sony E-mount lenses
 The Techart TZE-01/TZE-02 allows mounting Sony E-mount lenses on Z-mount cameras with full electronic integration. This adapter cannot be mounted on the Z 50 or the Z fc.
 The Megadap ETZ11 is similar to the Techart TZE-01/02 and adapts lenses with autofocus and image stabilization support. In contrast to the Techart adapter, the ETZ11 can be mounted on the Z 50 and Z fc.

See also

Nikkor
Nikon 1-mount
Nikon S-mount

References

External links

Nikon
Lens mounts

 Z-mount
Full-frame mirrorless interchangeable lens cameras